The ABC Bunny by Wanda Gág is a children's alphabet book, illustrated by the author in black and white, and hand lettered by her brother Howard. The music for the "ABC Song", included as a score in the book, was composed by the author's sister, Flavia.

The book, which was originally created for one of Wanda's nephew, was the last picture book to be awarded a Newbery Honor, in 1934, until 1972.

Plot
The rhythmic and rhyming text tells the story of Bunny, driven from Bunnyland to Elsewhere after an unfortunate accident with an apple. Every letter in the alphabet is represented in Bunny's journey: G for Gale, I for Insect and so on.

References

External links
Review

1933 children's books
American children's books
American picture books
Newbery Honor-winning works
Alphabet books
Books about rabbits and hares